Dlouhý Most is a municipality and village in Liberec District in the Liberec Region of the Czech Republic. It has about 900 inhabitants.

History
The first written mention of Dlouhý Most is from 1237.

Notable people
Franz Lefler (1831–1898), Austrian painter
Bruno Hübner (1899–1983), Austrian actor

References

External links

Villages in Liberec District